H.C. Andersen Arena is a multi-use indoor arena in Copenhagen, Denmark that is currently under planning.  If completed, it will be used mostly for concerts, ice hockey and handball matches.  The arena will have a capacity of 15,000 people.

It is named after Danish storyteller H. C. Andersen.

Proposed indoor arenas
Handball venues in Denmark
Indoor arenas in Denmark
Hans Christian Andersen
Proposed buildings and structures in Denmark